The fourth and final season of Cardfight!! Vanguard, titled , aired on Japanese TV networks from March 9, 2014 to October 19, 2014, for a total of 33 episodes.

This is a list of episodes from the anime Cardfight!! Vanguard. In July 2010, an anime television series based on the game was green-lit by TMS Entertainment under the directorial supervision of Hatsuki Tsuji. Music is composed by Takayuki Negishi while Mari Tominaga provided the character designs. The series began airing in Japan on TV Aichi beginning on January 8, 2011 and rebroadcast by AT-X, TV Tokyo, TV Osaka, and TV Setouchi systems.  The media-streaming website Crunchyroll simulcasted the first season to the United States, Canada, the United Kingdom, and Ireland. Crunchyroll began streaming the second season to the United States, Canada, and the United Kingdom on June 30, 2012.

Twenty-five pieces of theme music are used for the series—nine opening themes and seventeen closing themes (one of which is exclusive to the English dub). The anime also features two insert songs performed by Ultra Rare (i.e. Suzuko Mimori, Yoshino Nanjō, and Aimi Terakawa, who are the original Japanese voice actresses of Kourin, Rekka, and Suiko). The two songs are "Miracle Trigger ~Tomorrow Will Be Ultra Rare!~" (ミラクルトリガー ~きっと明日はウルトラレア!~) (used in episodes 18, 26, and 115; simply known as "Miracle Trigger" in the English dub) and "Stand Up! DREAM" (スタンドアップ! DREAM) (used in episodes 39, 115, and 118).

An English dub co-produced by Ocean Productions (recorded at Blue Water Studios) began airing on Singapore's Okto channel from October 16, 2011, on Animax Asia from January 22, 2012, and on Malaysia's RTM-TV2 channel from November 18, 2012. Dubbed episodes also began being released on YouTube from May 29, 2012. The series can be seen legally on a dedicated channel for it created by Bushiroad, the original creators and manufacturers of the card game, and as of June 25 is available for viewing in most countries without geo-blocking.

While there are a few changes, the English dub adaption is mostly faithful to the original Japanese version. However, the most notable change in the English dub is that three opening themes and three ending themes are used. The only openings are English versions of the first opening theme "Vanguard" (from eps. 1-65), the third opening theme "Limit Break" (from eps. 66-104), and the fourth opening theme "Vanguard Fight" (from eps. 105 onward), all of which are still performed by their original respective artists.

The first ending theme used in the dub is an English version of the third ending theme "Dream Shooter" (from eps. 1-65) while the second ending theme is a unique song titled "Way To Victory" (from eps. 66-104), both of which are performed by Sea☆A. The ending credit sequence for this exclusive theme is the one used for the original sixth ending theme "Jōnetsu-ism". The third ending theme used in the dub is an English version of the original ninth ending song "Endless☆Fighter" (from eps. 105 onward), which is performed only by Aimi Terakawa in the dub. Similarly, the Ultra Rare insert songs are performed in English by Suzuko Mimori, Yoshino Nanjō, and Aimi Terakawa (the original Japanese voice actresses of Kourin, Rekka, and Suiko).

Individual episodes from seasons 1-4 are known as "Rides".

Overview
The fourth season shifts to focus on Toshiki Kai as he tries to find Aichi, whose existence seems to have been erased from everybody's memories. This season did not receive an English dub.  Mainly to catch up with the recent season at the time, Vanguard G.  But presumably due to instances like: the script writer for the Japanese version of Legion mates quitting, so there was no source material to interpret into the dub; the season was regarded as lackluster, full of plot holes, and doesn't add anything that was carried off into G.  there has recently been a reply from Bushiroad stating that "there are currently no plans to dub legion mate", but then follows with something along the lines of "we'll talk about it"

Theme songs
Opening theme
 "V-ROAD" by BUSHI★7 (DAIGO, Psychic Lover, Mimori, Kitta, Suara, and Shūta Morishima) (eps. 164-179)
 "KNOCK ON YOUR GATE!" by Masatoshi Ono (eps. 180-196)
Ending theme
 "Get Up" by FAKY (eps. 164-179)
 "Get back yourself" by CERASUS (eps. 180-196)

Episode lists

References

2014 Japanese television seasons
Cardfight!! Vanguard